Eki Nurhakim (born September 3, 1983 in Bandung) is an Indonesian professional footballer who currently plays as a striker for Persatu Tuban in the Liga 2.

Club career statistics

Honours

Club honors
Sriwijaya
Liga Indonesia (1): 2007–08
Copa Indonesia (2): 2007–08, 2008–09

References

External links

1983 births
Association football forwards
Living people
Indonesian footballers
Liga 1 (Indonesia) players
Persiba Balikpapan players
Persijap Jepara players
Sriwijaya F.C. players
Sportspeople from Bandung